English pop singer Robbie Williams has won several awards throughout his successful solo career, including:

More Brit Awards than any other artist in music history, a record 18.
More Echo Music Prize Awards than any other artist ever, a record 12.

Ivor Novello Awards

|-
| 1998
| rowspan="2" | "Angels"
| Best Song Musically And Lyrically
| 
|-
| rowspan="2" | 1999
| Most Performed Work
| rowspan="3" 
|-
| Himself
| Songwriter of the Year
|-
| rowspan="2" | 2000
| rowspan="2" | "Strong"
| Best Song Musically And Lyrically
|-
| rowspan="2" | Most Performed Work
| rowspan="4" 
|-
| 2001
| "Rock DJ"
|-
| 2003
| rowspan="2" | "Feel"
| rowspan="2" | International Hit of the Year
|-
| 2004
|-
| 2005
| "Angels"
| Song of the Decade (1995-2004)
| 
|-
| 2007
| "Rudebox"
| International Hit of the Year
| 
|-
| 2012
| Take That
| PRS for Music Outstanding Contribution to British Music
|

Brit Awards
The Brit Awards are the British Phonographic Industry's annual popular music awards.

|-
| rowspan="4" | 1993 || "Could It Be Magic" || rowspan="3" | British Single of the Year || 
|-
| "It Only Takes a Minute" || rowspan="3" 
|-
| "A Million Love Songs"
|-
| Take That || British Breakthrough Act
|-
| rowspan="3" | 1994 || rowspan="2" | "Pray" || British Single of the Year || rowspan="2" 
|-
| British Video of the Year
|-
| Take That || British Group || 
|-
| rowspan="2" | 1996 || rowspan="2" | "Back for Good" || British Single of the Year || 
|-
| British Video of the Year || rowspan="4" 
|-
| rowspan="2" | 1998 || "Old Before I Die" || British Single of the Year 
|-
| Robbie Williams || British Male Solo Artist 
|-
| rowspan="6" | 1999 || I've Been Expecting You || British Album of the Year
|-
| "Angels" || rowspan="2" | British Single of the Year || 
|-
| rowspan="2" | "Millennium" || 
|-
| rowspan="2" | British Video of the Year || 
|-
| "Let Me Entertain You" || 
|-
| Robbie Williams || British Male Solo Artist || rowspan="3" 
|-
| rowspan="2" | 2000 || rowspan="2" | "She's the One" || British Single of the Year
|-
| British Video of the Year
|-
| rowspan="4" | 2001 || Sing When You're Winning || British Album of the Year || 
|-
| rowspan="2" | "Rock DJ" || British Single of the Year || rowspan="3" 
|-
| British Video of the Year
|-
| Robbie Williams || British Male Solo Artist
|-
| rowspan="4" | 2002 || "Eternity/The Road to Mandalay" || British Single of the Year || rowspan="3" 
|-
| "Kids"  || rowspan="2" | British Video of the Year
|-
| "Supreme"
|-
| Robbie Williams || British Male Solo Artist || 
|-
| 2003 || Robbie Williams || British Male Solo Artist || 
|-
| rowspan="2" | 2005 || "Do They Know It's Christmas?" || British Single of the Year || 
|-
| "Angels" || British Song of Twenty Five Years || 
|-
| 2006 || rowspan="2" | Robbie Williams || British Male Solo Artist || rowspan="5" 
|-
| 2007 || British Live Act
|-
| rowspan="4" | 2010 || "The Beatles Medley"  || rowspan="2" | Live Performance of Thirty Years
|- 
| "The Full Monty Medley" 
|-
| rowspan="2" | Robbie Williams || British Male Solo Artist
|-
| Outstanding Contribution to Music || 
|-
| rowspan="2" | 2011 || Progress || British Album of the Year || 
|-
| Take That || British Group || 
|-
| 2013 || "Candy" || British Single of the Year || 
|-
| 2017 || Robbie Williams || Icon Award || 
|}

GAFFA Awards

GAFFA Awards (Denmark)
Delivered since 1991, the GAFFA Awards are a Danish award that rewards popular music by the magazine of the same name. Williams has received one award out of seven nominations.

!
|-
| rowspan="2"| 1998
| rowspan="6"| Himself
| Foreign Male Act
| 
| style="text-align:center;" rowspan="16"|
|-
| Foreign Live Name
| 
|-
| 2000
| Best Foreign Male Act
| 
|-
| rowspan="2"| 2001
| Foreign Male Act
| 
|-
| Foreign Live Name
| 
|-
| 2002
| Best Foreign Male Act
| 
|-
| 2004
| What We Did Last Summer
| Best Foreign DVD
| 
|-
|}

GQ Men of the Year
The GQ is an international monthly men's magazine based in New York City and founded in 1931.

|-
| 1998 || rowspan="3" | Robbie Williams || rowspan="2" | Solo Artist of the Year || rowspan="3"
|-
| 2001
|-
| 2012 || Icon of the Year
|}

Grammy Awards
The Grammy Award is an award presented by The Recording Academy to recognize achievement in the mainly English-language music industry.

|-
| rowspan="2" | 2003 || "My Culture"  || Best Music Video  || rowspan="2" 
|-
| Robbie Williams: Live at the Albert || Best Music Film 
|}

Italian Music Awards
The Italian Music Awards were an accolade established in 2001 by the Federazione Industria Musicale Italiana to recognize the achievements in the Italian music industry both by domestic and international artists.

|-
| 2001 || rowspan="3" | Robbie Williams || rowspan="3" | Best International Male Artist || rowspan="2" 
|-
| 2002
|-
| 2003 || 
|}

Los Premios MTV Latinoamérica
The Los Premios MTV Latinoamérica was the Latin America version of the MTV Video Music Award.

|-
| 2003 || rowspan="2" | Robbie Williams || rowspan="2" | Best Pop Artist — International || 
|-
| 2006 || 
|}

Mercury Prize
The Mercury Prize is an annual music prize awarded for the best album from the United Kingdom and Ireland.

|-
| 1994 || Everything Changes || rowspan="2" | Mercury Music Prize || rowspan="2" 
|-
| 1998 || Life thru a Lens
|}

MTV Asia Awards
The MTV Asia Awards is the Asian equivalent of the MTV Europe Music Award.

|-
| 2002 || rowspan="5" | Robbie Williams || rowspan="5" | Favorite Male Artist || 
|-
| 2003 || 
|-
| 2004 || rowspan="3" 
|-
| 2005
|-
| 2006
|}

MTV Europe Music Award
The MTV Europe Music Award is an award presented by Viacom International Media Networks Europe to honor artists and music in popular culture.

|-
| 1994 || rowspan="2" | Take That || Best Group || rowspan="2" 
|-
| 1995 || Best Live Act
|-
| rowspan="3" | 1998 || Life thru a Lens || Best Album || rowspan="2" 
|-
| "Angels" || Best Song
|-
| rowspan="2" | Robbie Williams || rowspan="2" | Best Male || 
|-
| 1999 || 
|-
| rowspan="5" | 2000 || rowspan="2" | "Rock DJ" || Best Song || 
|-
| Best Video || rowspan="5" 
|-
| rowspan="3" | Robbie Williams || Best Male
|-
| Best Pop
|-
| Best UK & Ireland Act
|-
| rowspan="2" | 2001 || "Supreme" || Best Video
|-
| rowspan="2" | Robbie Williams || rowspan="2" | Best Male || 
|-
| 2002 || rowspan="6" 
|-
| rowspan="3" | 2003 || Escapology || Best Album
|-
| rowspan="9" | Robbie Williams || Best Male
|-
| Best Pop
|-
| rowspan="2" | 2004 || Best Male
|-
| Best Pop
|-
| rowspan="2" | 2005 || Best Male || 
|-
| Best Pop || rowspan="4" 
|-
| rowspan="2" | 2006 || Best Male
|-
| Best Pop
|-
| 2009 || Best Male
|-
| 2017 || For the Artists for Grenfell initiative || Power of Music Award || 
|}

MTV Video Music Award
The MTV Video Music Award is an award presented by the cable channel MTV to honor the best in the music video medium.

|-
| 1994 || "Babe" || International Viewer's Choice Award for MTV Europe || 
|-
| rowspan="3" | 2001 || rowspan="3" | "Rock DJ" || Best Male Video || rowspan="2" 
|-
| Breakthrough Video
|-
| Best Visual Effects || 
|}

NME Awards
The NME Awards are annual music awards show founded by the music magazine NME. 

|-
| 2002
| rowspan=2|Himself
| Best Pop Act 
| rowspan="2" 
|-
| rowspan=3|2003
| Worst Style
|-
| Escapology
| Worst Album 
| rowspan="2" 
|-
| "Feel"
| Worst Single 
|-
| 2006
| Himself 
| Worst Style
| 
|-
| 2007
| Rudebox
| Worst Album
|

Pollstar Concert Industry Awards
The Pollstar Concert Industry Awards aim to reward the best in the business of shows and concerts. 

|-
| rowspan=2|2000
| Himself
| Best New Artist Tour
| rowspan="2" 
|-
| 1999 Tour 
| Club Tour of the Year

Popjustice 20 Quid Music Prize
The Popjustice £20 Music Prize, also known as the Popjustice Twenty Quid Prize, is an annual prize awarded by music website Popjustice to recognise the best British pop single of the previous year. The prize was conceived by Popjustice founder Peter Robinson in 2003 as a reaction to what he perceived as the pompous and elitist nature of the existing Mercury Prize, which recognises the best album of the previous year, and in particular its exclusion of pop music acts in favour of those from more esoteric genres. The shortlist for the Popjustice prize is announced in September of each year and the winner named the following month, to coincide with the presentation of the Mercury Prize. Popjustice gives a token prize of £20 to the winner of its award, in contrast to the £20,000 given to the winner of the Mercury Prize.

|-
| 2005
| "Radio"
| rowspan=3|Best British Pop Single
| rowspan="3" 
|-
| 2007 
| "She's Madonna"
|-
| 2013
| "Candy"

UK Music Video Awards
The UK Music Video Awards is an annual award ceremony founded in 2008 to recognise creativity, technical excellence and innovation in music videos and moving images for music. 

|-
| 2010
| "You Know Me"
| rowspan=2|Best Art Direction
| rowspan="3" 
|-
| rowspan=2|2013
| rowspan=2|"Goin' Crazy"
|-
| Best Pop Video (UK)

ZD Awards 
 Zvukovaya Dorozhka  ("sound track") is  Russia's oldest hit parade in field of popular music. Since 2003 it is presented in a ceremony in concert halls. It's considered one of the major Russian music awards.

!
|-
| 2015
| Let Me Entertain You Tour (live at Olimpiysky)
| Tour of the Year
| 
| style="text-align:center;" |
|-
|}

Žebřík Music Awards 

!Ref.
|-
| 2000
| "Rock DJ"
| Best International Video
| 
| rowspan=6|
|-
| 2001
| rowspan=2|Himself
| rowspan=2|Best International Male
| 
|-
| rowspan=2|2002
| 
|-
| "Feel"
| Best International Song
| 
|-
| rowspan=2|2003
| rowspan=4|Himself
| Best International Male
| 
|-
| rowspan=2|Best International Personality
| 
|-
| rowspan=3|2004
| 
| rowspan=18|
|-
| Best International Male
| 
|-
| "Radio"
| Best International Song
| 
|-
| rowspan=6|2005
| rowspan=3|Himself
| Best International Male
| 
|-
| Best International Personality
| 
|-
| Best International Průser
| 
|-
| Intensive Care
| Best International Album
| 
|-
| rowspan=2|"Tripping"
| Best International Song
| 
|-
| rowspan=2|Best International Video
| 
|-
| rowspan=2|2006
| "Lovelight"
| 
|-
| rowspan=4|Himself
| rowspan=4|Best International Male
| 
|-
| 2007
| 
|-
| 2008
| 
|-
| rowspan=4|2009
| 
|-
| Reality Killed the Video Star
| Best International Album
| 
|-
| rowspan=2|"Bodies"
| Best International Song
| 
|-
| Best International Video
| 
|-
| 2010
| rowspan=2|Himself
| rowspan=2|Best International Male
| 
|-
| rowspan=2|2012
| 
| rowspan=4|
|-
| "Candy"
| Best International Song
| 
|-
| rowspan=2|2017
| rowspan=2|Himself
| Best International Male
| 
|-
| Best International Live
|

1996
Smash Hits Awards [UK]: Funniest Person In The World #1 
TV Hits Poll [UK]: Funniest Person Number #1

1997
The Sun Newspaper [UK]: Best Male Singer

1998
Nordorff Robbins Silver Clef Awards [UK]: Best Newcomer 
The London Awards [UK]: Best Male Vocalist 
TMF Awards [NL]: Best Male Singer 
The Sun Newspaper [UK]: Best Album - I've Been Expecting You, Best Live Act, Best Male Singer 
Hit Radio FM 99.7 Music Award [Hong Kong]: Best International Male Singer 
Maaraiv Lanoar and Channel 1 Award [Israel]: Best Male Single Of The Year 
Cable YMC Award [Hong Kong]: Best International Male 
Musikexpress [D]: Best Solo Artist of 1998 
Smash Hits Awards [UK]: Best Male Solo Star #1 
Sky Magazine [UK]: Action Man Of The Year

1999
The 12th Headlines Readers Poll Awards [Hong Kong]: Best Male #1, Best Songs "Millennium", Best Album "I've Been Expecting You", Best Video "Millennium" 
Smash Hits Awards [UK]: Best Male Solo Star #1 
Melody Maker's Readers' Poll [UK]: Best Male Solo Singer, Fool Of The Year 
Top Of The Pops [UK]: Best Male Solo Artist 
New Musical Express Premier Awards [UK]: Best Solo Artist 
"Company" Magazine [UK]: Most sexiest male of the planet 
"Cosmopolitan” Magazine [UK]: Most sexiest male of all 
"PlayStation" Magazine [UK]: Most popular icon of 20th century

2000
Capital Radio Awards [UK]: Best Male Solo Artist, Best British [Single "She's The One", Best *British Video "She's The One" 
"Company" Magazine [UK]: Most sexiest male of the planet 
Q Awards (Magazine Q) [UK]: Best Songwriter

2001
NRJ Music Awards [F]: Nominations for: Best artist international, Best website 
Capital Awards [UK]: Best album "Sing When You're Winning" 
"Company" Magazine [UK]: Most sexiest male of the planet

2002
Echo Awards [D]: Best male artist international  
Edison Award [NL]: Best male artist international "Swing when you're winning"
Hong Kong Top Sales Music Awards [HK]: Top 10 Best Selling Foreign Albums "Swing When You're Winning"

2003
 NRJ Radio Awards [S]: Best International Male Artist 
 NRJ Radio Awards [S]: Best Pop "Feel"
 NRJ Music Awards [F]: Nominations For: Best Male International
 NRJ Music Awards [F]: Nominations For: Best Song: "Feel" 
 Echo Awards [D]: Best International Male Artist 
 TMF Awards Nederland: Best Male
 TMF Awards Nederland: Best Videoclip: "Feel"
 TMF Awards Nederland: Best Single: "Feel" 
 Amadeus Music Awards [A]: Best International Artist Of The Year 
 Lycra British Style Awards [UK]: Most Elegant Male Artist 
 Q Awards [Magazine Q] [UK]: Best Live Act 
 Edison Award [NL]: Best Male Artist International "Escapology"
 Oye! Award [Mexico]: Best Album By A Solo Male - International Category For "Escapology"

2004
Echo Awards [D]: Best male international 
Echo Awards [D]: Best Music-DVD
TMF Awards [NL]: Best male international 
Nordic Music Award [N]: Special award of honor for being one of the best selling artists in *Denmark, Sweden and Norway 
Music Hall of fame [UK]: award for 'Induction for 1990's' 
Edison Award [NL]: Best male artist international "Live Summer 2003"
Oye Award [Mexico]: Most sold records by an international Artist
Hong Kong Top Sales Music Awards [HK]: Top 10 Best Selling Foreign Albums "Greatest Hits"

2005
Echo Awards [D]: Best male international
RAFT Award [UK] : Best male, best live act
Oye! Award [Mexico]: Most sold records by an international Artist
Oye! Award [Mexico]: International Song of the Year, "Radio"
Hong Kong Top Sales Music Awards [HK]: Top 10 Best Selling Foreign Albums "Intensive Care"

2006
NRJ Music Awards [F]: Best male international 
D.I.V.A. [D] : German Music Award 
Echo Award [D]: Best male international
Hong Kong Top Sales Music Awards [HK]: Top 10 Best Selling Foreign Albums "Rudebox"

2007
Echo Award [D]: Best International Male
Echo Award [D]: Best Music-DVD
Oye! Award [Mexico]: International Song of the Year, "Rudebox"

2010
 Echo Award [D]: Best International Male
 NRJ Music Awards [F]: Best International Male Artist 
 Virgin Media Awards: Best Male Artist
 Q Award for Best Collaboration song ("Shame" with Gary Barlow)

2011
Echo Award [D] - Best International Group (with Take That)
Flecking Awards - Nomination for Most Stylish Male

2012
Virgin Media Awards - Hottest Male
Virgin Media Awards - Best Live Act (with Take That)
The 4Music Video Honours - Best Video "Candy"
The Sun Newspaper - Best male international

2013
ECHO Award - Best international pop/rock artist
Q Awards - Q Idol
Heart FM - Live Artist Of The Year
Bambi Awards - Entertainment

2014
ECHO Award - Best international pop/rock artist
Artist and Manager Awards - Artists

2016
Bambi Awards - International Music

2019
National Television Awards: Nomination for TV Judge (for The X Factor)

References

Lists of awards received by British musician
Awards
British music-related lists